Katherine Virginia "Kassie" DePaiva (née Wesley; born March 21, 1961) is an American actress and singer. She is best known for her role as Bobby Joe in the horror film Evil Dead II (1987) and her work in American daytime soap operas. She’s also well known for her 20-year portrayal of Blair Cramer on ABC's One Life to Live. Other roles included Chelsea Reardon on Guiding Light and Eve Donovan on NBC's Days of Our Lives, receiving 2 Daytime Emmy nominations for the latter.

Career
DePaiva began her career at 18 as a solo artist at the Grand Ole Opry. After her stint in Nashville, she attended both Indiana University and UCLA, studying theatre, dropping out before graduation to entertain USO troops in Asia. She appeared as a contestant on the CBS game show Body Language, teaming with soap opera star Catherine Hickland.  DePaiva made her debut in daytime originating the role of Chelsea Reardon on Guiding Light (October 1986–January 1991). On Monday, November 29, 1993, she began portraying her most notable role, the part of Blair Daimler Cramer on One Life to Live, formerly portrayed by half-Asian actress, Mia Korf. She first appeared Friday, December 17, 1993, and was with OLTL for nearly 19 years until the series was cancelled. DePaiva's pairing with the character Todd Manning struck a cord with viewers.  In 2012, she reprised her role of Blair for several guest stints on ABC's  daytime serial General Hospital.

In January 2014, Soap Opera Digest confirmed that DePaiva had joined the cast of the NBC serial Days of Our Lives as Eve Donovan. DePaiva made her debut on July 18, 2014. In September 2015, DePaiva was let go from the soap, with her last appearance on February 2, 2016; she later returned for several guest appearances in June and December of the same year. DePaiva returned full-time on October 27, 2017. In August 2017 it was announced that she would appear in the music film Killian & the Comeback Kids alongside former One Life to Live co-star Nathan Purdee.

Personal life
DePaiva has been married to fellow One Life to Live actor James DePaiva since May 31, 1996, and gave birth to their son, James Quentin DePaiva, on May 12, 1997. She was previously married to Richard C. Hankins. In August 2016, DePaiva announced she had been diagnosed with acute myeloid leukemia the month prior.

Filmography

Awards and nominations

See also
 Todd Manning and Blair Cramer

References

External links
 
 The Kassie DePaiva Page
 

1961 births
Living people
20th-century American actresses
21st-century American actresses
Actresses from Kentucky
American film actresses
American soap opera actresses
American women country singers
American country singer-songwriters
Contestants on American game shows
People from Morganfield, Kentucky
Country musicians from Kentucky
Singer-songwriters from Kentucky
Kentucky women musicians
Singers from Kentucky